Eric Jacobson is an American puppeteer. He is best known for performing Miss Piggy, Fozzie Bear, Animal, and Sam Eagle for The Muppets Studio, as well as Sesame Street characters Bert, Grover, Oscar the Grouch, and Guy Smiley—all roles that he inherited from the characters' original performers, Frank Oz, Caroll Spinney, and Jim Henson.

Since 1994, Jacobson has been a regular performer for Sesame Street, where he has received Daytime Emmy Award and Primetime Emmy Award nominations. Since 2001, Jacobson has appeared as part of the Muppets cast in several feature films and television series, including The Muppets' Wizard of Oz, The Muppets, Muppets Most Wanted, and the ABC primetime television series, The Muppets.

Career
Eric Jacobson, a native of Fort Worth, was inspired to enter the field of puppeteering after the death of Jim Henson while he was attending film school. Jacobson initially began his career as a puppeteer on Sesame Street in 1994, where he worked alongside Frank Oz, often performing the roles of Grover and Bert when Oz wasn't available. After Oz retired from the roles, Jacobson became the characters' primary performer. He also took on Guy Smiley, a role previously performed by Henson. Jacobson also began performing Oscar the Grouch after Caroll Spinney's retirement in 2018. For his work on Sesame Street, Jacobson has been nominated for both a Daytime Emmy Award for Outstanding Performer in Children's Programming and a Primetime Emmy Award for Outstanding Character Voice-Over Performance in 2011 and 2019, respectively. 

Similarly for the Muppets, Jacobson began performing Miss Piggy in 2001. The following year, he began performing Fozzie Bear and Animal, debuting in those roles in It's a Very Merry Muppet Christmas Movie. He also began performing Sam Eagle beginning in The Muppets' Wizard of Oz (2005). All the aforementioned characters were also previously performed by Oz, whom Jacobson consulted with to accurately portray the proper characterization, physicality, and voice for the characters.

In 2001, the same year that he worked on The Book of Pooh, where he performed as Piglet and Kanga, he also began playing Miss Piggy, debuting at the "Muppetfest" convention.

Other works
Jacobson performed Harry the Duck and other characters on Bear in the Big Blue House.

Outside of Henson, Jacobson has worked on The Puzzle Place, Jack's Big Music Show, and Disney's The Book of Pooh (plus a TV show called Once Upon a Tree, in which he performed Billy Bob the Bobcat). He also has performed on stage performing live puppet theater in New York City with The Puppet Company, The Cosmic Bicycle Theater, and The Swedish Cottage Marionette Theater in Central Park.

In 2013, Jacobson served as puppeteer for Shaggy Rogers (with Matthew Lillard serving as Shaggy's voice) for the DVD movie Scooby Doo! Adventures: The Mystery Map.

Guest appearances
Jacobson performed Miss Piggy for appearances on Rove Live, Live with Regis and Kelly, The Tony Danza Show, Good Morning America, This Morning, WWE Raw, Take Two with Phineas and Ferb, Good Luck Charlie, WWE Tribute to the Troops, and also performed Miss Piggy for an appearance in an episode of the Disney Channel Original Series So Random!.

Jacobson performed Grover during appearances on Good Morning Australia, Rove Live, and Jimmy Kimmel Live!. He performed Fozzie Bear during appearances on Saturday Night Live, Jimmy Kimmel Live!, The Late Late Show with Craig Ferguson, @midnight, and Big City Greens (voice role as the character of Dr. Enamel). Jacobson performed Miss Piggy, Fozzie Bear, and Animal for an appearance on Extreme Makeover: Home Edition. Jacobson performed Bert for the character’s appearance in the Between the Lions''' second season episode "Tweet! Tweet!".

Personal life
Jacobson is married to Mary Jacobson, who works as a production assistant on Sesame Street''. His daughter's godfather also works on the show.

Credits

References

External links
 
 Bunnytown

Living people
Sesame Street Muppeteers
People from Fort Worth, Texas
Muppet performers
Year of birth missing (living people)